Mermessus is a genus of spiders in the family Linyphiidae. It was first described in 1899 by O. Pickard-Cambridge. , it contains 81 species.

Species list
Mermessus comprises the following species:

 Mermessus agressus (Gertsch & Davis, 1937) – US, Mexico
 Mermessus albulus (Zorsch & Crosby, 1934) – US
 Mermessus annamae (Gertsch & Davis, 1937) – Mexico
 Mermessus antraeus (Crosby, 1926) – US, Mexico
 Mermessus augustae (Crosby & Bishop, 1933) – US
 Mermessus augustalis (Crosby & Bishop, 1933) – US, Canada
 Mermessus avius (Millidge, 1987) – Mexico
 Mermessus brevidentatus (Emerton, 1909) – US
 Mermessus bryantae (Ivie & Barrows, 1935) – North America, Cuba, Venezuela, Azores
 Mermessus caelebs (Millidge, 1987) – Panama, Venezuela
 Mermessus coahuilanus (Gertsch & Davis, 1940) – US, Mexico
 Mermessus cognatus (Millidge, 1987) – Mexico to Costa Rica
 Mermessus colimus (Millidge, 1987) – Mexico
 Mermessus comes (Millidge, 1987) – Mexico
 Mermessus conexus (Millidge, 1987) – Mexico
 Mermessus conjunctus (Millidge, 1991) – Brazil
 Mermessus contortus (Emerton, 1882) – US
 Mermessus denticulatus (Banks, 1898) – US to Colombia (Europe, North Africa, introduced)
 Mermessus dentiger O. P.-Cambridge, 1899 – US to Guatemala, Caribbean
 Mermessus dentimandibulatus (Keyserling, 1886) – Colombia, Peru
 Mermessus dominicus (Millidge, 1987) – Dominica
 Mermessus dopainus (Chamberlin & Ivie, 1936) – Mexico
 Mermessus entomologicus (Emerton, 1911) – US, Canada
 Mermessus estrellae (Millidge, 1987) – Mexico
 Mermessus facetus (Millidge, 1987) – Costa Rica
 Mermessus floridus (Millidge, 1987) – US
 Mermessus formosus (Millidge, 1987) – Mexico
 Mermessus fractus (Millidge, 1987) – Costa Rica
 Mermessus fradeorum (Berland, 1932) – Cosmopolitan
 Mermessus fuscus (Millidge, 1987) – Mexico
 Mermessus hebes (Millidge, 1991) – Venezuela
 Mermessus holdus (Chamberlin & Ivie, 1939) – US, Canada
 Mermessus hospita (Millidge, 1987) – Mexico
 Mermessus ignobilis (Millidge, 1987) – Mexico
 Mermessus imago (Millidge, 1987) – Mexico
 Mermessus index (Emerton, 1914) – US, Canada
 Mermessus indicabilis (Crosby & Bishop, 1928) – US
 Mermessus inornatus (Ivie & Barrows, 1935) – US
 Mermessus insulsus (Millidge, 1991) – Peru
 Mermessus jona (Bishop & Crosby, 1938) – US, Canada
 Mermessus leoninus (Millidge, 1987) – Mexico
 Mermessus libanus (Millidge, 1987) – Mexico
 Mermessus lindrothi (Holm, 1960) – Alaska
 Mermessus maculatus (Banks, 1892) – Russia, Canada to Guatemala
 Mermessus maderus (Millidge, 1987) – US
 Mermessus major (Millidge, 1987) – US
 Mermessus mediocris (Millidge, 1987) – US, Canada
 Mermessus medius (Millidge, 1987) – Mexico
 Mermessus merus (Millidge, 1987) – Mexico
 Mermessus mniarus (Crosby & Bishop, 1928) – US
 Mermessus modicus (Millidge, 1987) – US
 Mermessus montanus (Millidge, 1987) – Mexico
 Mermessus monticola (Millidge, 1987) – Mexico
 Mermessus moratus (Millidge, 1987) – Mexico
 Mermessus naniwaensis (Oi, 1960) – China, Japan
 Mermessus nigrus (Millidge, 1991) – Colombia
 Mermessus obscurus (Millidge, 1991) – Colombia
 Mermessus orbus (Millidge, 1987) – Mexico
 Mermessus ornatus (Millidge, 1987) – Mexico
 Mermessus paludosus (Millidge, 1987) – Canada
 Mermessus paulus (Millidge, 1987) – US
 Mermessus perplexus (Millidge, 1987) – Mexico
 Mermessus persimilis (Millidge, 1987) – Mexico
 Mermessus pinicola (Millidge, 1987) – Mexico
 Mermessus probus (Millidge, 1987) – Mexico
 Mermessus proximus (Keyserling, 1886) – Peru
 Mermessus rapidulus (Bishop & Crosby, 1938) – Nicaragua, Costa Rica, Panama
 Mermessus singularis (Millidge, 1987) – Mexico
 Mermessus socius (Chamberlin, 1949) – US
 Mermessus sodalis (Millidge, 1987) – US
 Mermessus solitus (Millidge, 1987) – US
 Mermessus solus (Millidge, 1987) – Mexico
 Mermessus subantillanus (Millidge, 1987) – Guadeloupe
 Mermessus taibo (Chamberlin & Ivie, 1933) – US, Canada
 Mermessus tenuipalpis (Emerton, 1911) – US
 Mermessus tepejicanus (Gertsch & Davis, 1937) – Mexico
 Mermessus tibialis (Millidge, 1987) – US
 Mermessus tlaxcalanus (Gertsch & Davis, 1937) – Mexico
 Mermessus tridentatus (Emerton, 1882) – US, Canada, Puerto Rico
 Mermessus trilobatus (Emerton, 1882) – Holarctic
 Mermessus undulatus (Emerton, 1914) – US, Canada

See also
 List of Linyphiidae species

References

External links

Linyphiidae
Spiders of North America
Spiders of South America
Spiders of Russia
Spiders of Asia
Araneomorphae genera